Stenaelurillus is a genus of jumping spiders that was first described by Eugène Louis Simon in 1886. Most species live in Africa, with some species found in Asia, including China. All species have two white longitudinal stripes on the carapace, and both sexes show strong bristles around the eyes. The name is a combination of the Greek sten- "narrow" and the salticid genus Aelurillus.

Species
 it contains forty-six species, found only in Africa and Asia:
Stenaelurillus abramovi Logunov, 2008 – Thailand, Vietnam
Stenaelurillus albopunctatus Caporiacco, 1949 – Kenya
Stenaelurillus albus Sebastian, Sankaran, Malamel & Joseph, 2015 – India
Stenaelurillus arambagensis (Biswas & Biswas, 1992) – India
Stenaelurillus bandama Logunov & Azarkina, 2018 – Ivory Coast
Stenaelurillus belihuloya Logunov & Azarkina, 2018 – Sri Lanka
Stenaelurillus brandbergensis (Wesolowska, 2006) – Namibia
Stenaelurillus darwini Wesolowska & Russell-Smith, 2000 – Tanzania, Kenya
Stenaelurillus furcatus Wesolowska, 2014 – Namibia
Stenaelurillus fuscatus Wesolowska & Russell-Smith, 2000 – Kenya, Tanzania
Stenaelurillus fuscus Cao & Li, 2016 – China
Stenaelurillus gabrieli Prajapati, Murthappa, Sankaran & Sebastian, 2016 – India
Stenaelurillus glaber Wesolowska & Russell-Smith, 2011 – Ghana, Nigeria, Uganda
Stenaelurillus guttatus (Wesolowska & Cumming, 2002) – Namibia, Zambia, Botswana, Zimbabwe
Stenaelurillus guttiger (Simon, 1901) – Botswana, Mozambique, Zimbabwe, South Africa
Stenaelurillus hirsutus Lessert, 1927 – Senegal, Ghana, Congo, Central Africa, Uganda, Tanzania, Kenya
Stenaelurillus ignobilis Wesolowska & Cumming, 2011 – Zimbabwe
Stenaelurillus iubatus Wesolowska & Russell-Smith, 2011 – Nigeria
Stenaelurillus jagannathae Das, Malik & Vidhel, 2015 – India
Stenaelurillus jocquei Logunov & Azarkina, 2018 – Cameroon
Stenaelurillus kavango Wesolowska, 2014 – Namibia
Stenaelurillus kronestedti Próchniewicz & Heçiak, 1994 – Tanzania
Stenaelurillus latibulbis Wesołowska, 2014 – Congo, Zambia
Stenaelurillus lesserti Reimoser, 1934 – India, Sri Lanka
Stenaelurillus leucogrammus Simon, 1902 – Zimbabwe, Mozambique
Stenaelurillus mardanicus Ali & Maddison, 2018 – Pakistan
Stenaelurillus marusiki Logunov, 2001 – Iran
Stenaelurillus metallicus Caleb & Mathai, 2016 – India
Stenaelurillus minutus Song & Chai, 1991 – China
Stenaelurillus mirabilis Wesołowska & Russell-Smith, 2000 – Tanzania, Kenya
Stenaelurillus modestus Wesołowska, 2014 – South Africa
Stenaelurillus nigricaudus Simon, 1886 (type) – Algeria, Gambia, Senegal, Mali, Niger, Burkina Faso
Stenaelurillus pecten Wesolowska, 2014 – Botswana, Zambia
Stenaelurillus pilosus Wesołowska & Russell-Smith, 2011 – Nigeria
Stenaelurillus pseudoguttatus Logunov & Azarkina, 2018 – Namibia
Stenaelurillus sarojinae Caleb & Mathai, 2014 – India
Stenaelurillus senegalensis Logunov & Azarkina, 2018 – Senegal
Stenaelurillus siyamae Logunov & Azarkina, 2018 – Sudan
Stenaelurillus specularis Wesolowska, 2014 – Malawi
Stenaelurillus strandi Caporiacco, 1939 – Ethiopia
Stenaelurillus striolatus Wesołowska & Russell-Smith, 2011 – Nigeria
Stenaelurillus sudanicus Wesolowska, 2014 – Sudan
Stenaelurillus termitophagus (Wesołowska & Cumming, 1999) – Namibia, Botswana, South Africa
Stenaelurillus triguttatus Simon, 1886 – Nepal, Tibet
Stenaelurillus uniguttatus Lessert, 1925 – Ethiopia, East Africa
Stenaelurillus zambiensis Wesołowska, 2014 – Malawi, Zambia, Zimbabwe

Nomen dubium
 Stenaelurillus giovae Caporiacco, 1936
 Stenaelurillus setosus (Thorell, 1895)

References

Salticidae
Salticidae genera
Spiders of Africa
Spiders of Asia